Vlatka Pokos (Vlatka Vuković) (born March 22, 1970 in Salzburg, Austria) is a Croatian jet setter, former singer and former television host.
Due to her controversial lifestyle and up-and-down entertainment career, Vlatka is still, up to this day, a subject of constant media attention.

Early years
After graduating from high school, she moved to Zagreb.

She started her singing career in Silver Wings (Srebrna Krila) where she was credited for two albums that achieved a medium level of success. In the early 1990s she became a TV host for two major Sunday night shows (Bravo, Sedma noć) on Croatian National Television. Instantly, Vlatka became one of the most recognizable faces in Croatia. In the summer of 1995 she launched her only solo hit "Petak" (Friday).

Controversies 
In June 2007 her marriage with Josip Radeljak abruptly ended when he kicked her out of their apartment. A fierce media battle between former sweethearts ensued, with Radeljak tossing his wedding ring in Croatian prime-time TV show and accusing Vlatka of physically abusing Lana. On the other hand, Vlatka is accusing her former husband that he treated her worse than his domestic helpers. In 2010 Vlatka Pokos published a book "Life in Heaven" which, although it was criticised as simplistic and banal, received a lot of media attention. Her former husband's new squeeze, Dolores Lambaša, started participating in the media battle with Pokos announcing her book called Life in Hell which was to document alleged abuses over Radeljak's daughter Lana who Vlatka allegedly mistreated.

Filmography

Television

References

External links
 The Official Web Presentation 

1970 births
Living people
21st-century Croatian women singers
Musicians from Zagreb
20th-century Croatian women singers